Kurgja  is a village in Põhja-Pärnumaa Parish, Pärnu County in western-central Estonia. Prior to the 2017 administrative reform of Estonian local governments, the village was part of Vändra Parish.

References

 

Villages in Pärnu County